Caroline Ernst (February 13, 1819 – May 12, 1902) was an American settler. She was born on February 13, 1819, in Germany. Her parents, Louise Ernst and Johann Friedrich Ernst moved to Texas in 1831. The family settled in Austin County, Texas and established the first permanent German colony in Texas. Ernst published her account Life of German Pioneers in Early Texas in 1899. She married Louis von Roeder, and the couple had three children before Louis died in the Texas Cart War. Ernst died in 1902.

References

1819 births
1902 deaths
American pioneers
German emigrants to the United States
People from Austin County, Texas